The Express Series 90 is an American homebuilt aircraft that was designed and produced by the Express Aircraft Company of Olympia, Washington, introduced in the late 1980s. When it was available the aircraft was supplied as a kit for amateur construction.

Design and development
The Express Series 90 is a development of the earlier Wheeler Express designed by Ken Wheeler. It incorporates a 20% larger tail which gives it a wider center of gravity range, while also enhancing pitch and yaw stability.

The aircraft features a cantilever low-wing, a four-seat enclosed cabin, fixed tricycle landing gear with wheel pants and a single engine in tractor configuration.

The Series 90 is made from composites. The standard engine used is the  Lycoming IO-540 four stroke, air-cooled, six cylinder powerplant.

The manufacturer estimated the construction time from the supplied kit as 2000 hours.

Operational history
In December 2013 three examples were registered in the United States with the Federal Aviation Administration.

Specifications (Series 90)

References

External links
Photo of an Express Series 90

Series 90
1980s United States civil utility aircraft
1980s United States sport aircraft
Single-engined tractor aircraft
Low-wing aircraft
Homebuilt aircraft